Fawru  is a village in Syria located in the Subdistrict of the al-Suqaylabiyah District in the Hama Governorate. According to the Syria Central Bureau of Statistics (CBS), Fawru had a population of 475 in the 2004 census. Its inhabitants are predominantly Alawites.

References 

Alawite communities in Syria
Populated places in al-Suqaylabiyah District